Colonești is a commune in Bacău County, Western Moldavia, Romania. It is composed of seven villages: Călini, Colonești, Poiana, Satu Nou, Spria, Valea Mare and Zăpodia.

References

Communes in Bacău County
Localities in Western Moldavia